German submarine U-373 was a Type VIIC U-boat of Nazi Germany's Kriegsmarine during World War II.

She carried out thirteen patrols before being sunk by a British aircraft on 8 June 1944 in the Bay of Biscay.*

Design
German Type VIIC submarines were preceded by the shorter Type VIIB submarines. U-373 had a displacement of  when at the surface and  while submerged. She had two shafts and two  propellers.

U-373 was fitted with five  torpedo tubes (four fitted at the bow and one at the stern), fourteen torpedoes, one  SK C/35 naval gun, 220 rounds, and a  C/30 anti-aircraft gun. The boat had a complement of between forty-four and sixty.

Service history
The submarine was laid down on 8 December 1939 at the Howaldtswerke at Kiel as yard number 3, launched on 5 April 1941 and commissioned on 22 May under the command of Kapitänleutnant Paul-Karl Loeser.

First patrol
The boat's first patrol was preceded by short trips between Kiel in Germany and Horten Naval Base and Trondheim in Norway in July and August 1941. Her first patrol proper commenced with her departure from Trondheim on 4 September. Negotiation of the gap separating Iceland and the Faroe Islands was followed by sweeps southeast of Greenland. The submarine then docked at Brest in occupied France on 2 October.

Second to fifth patrols
U-373s initial patrols were fairly routine. All that changed on the second part of her fourth sortie when she sank the Mount Lycabettus off the eastern United States/Canadian coast on 17 March 1942. She was chartered by Switzerland and was sailing with neutrality mark: Switzerland cross painting with "Switzerland" written on the hull. On the 22nd, she sank the Thursobank east of Chesapeake Bay. The surviving Chinese crewmen from this ship were arrested for mutiny immediately after landing. It was alleged that they had denied the British officers a share of the food and warm clothing.

She then sank the John R. Williams on 26 June 1942 with a mine laid on the 11th off Cape May.

Sixth, seventh and eighth patrols
The Norwegian corvette dropped five depth charges, but the U-boat was not damaged.

The boat's seventh foray was uneventful, but on her eighth she was bombed by a B-24 Liberator of the USAAF on 2 March 1943. Damage was moderate; after repairs, U-373 continued with her patrol.

Ninth patrol
On 24 July 1943, the submarine was attacked west of Madeira by Grumman Avenger and Wildcat aircraft from the escort carrier . Two men were killed, another seven were wounded. The boat was damaged by a FIDO homing torpedo, but was able to carry-on with her patrol.

10th and 11th patrols
During the third part of a three-part patrol on 10 November 1943, a lookout broke his arm while the submarine fought bad weather.

U-373 had a lucky escape when she was attacked by a British Vickers Wellington of No. 612 Squadron RAF on 3 January 1944 in the Bay of Biscay. A second aircraft, a Liberator of 224 Squadron joined in. On tying up in Brest, two unexploded depth charges were discovered lodged in the conning tower. The boat was compelled to put to sea once more to jettison her unwanted extra 'cargo' in another hazardous operation.

12th and 13th patrols and loss
The boat left Brest for the last time on 7 June 1944. The following day, she was sunk by a RAF Liberator bomber of 224 Squadron in the Bay of Biscay. The same aircraft sank  20 minutes later.

Four men died in U-373; there were 47 survivors.

Wolfpacks
U-373 took part in 16 wolfpacks, namely:
 Markgraf (8 – 15 September 1941) 
 Brandenburg (15 – 24 September 1941) 
 Störtebecker (5 – 16 November 1941) 
 Seydlitz (27 December 1941 – 2 January 1942) 
 Lohs (11 August – 21 September 1942) 
 Draufgänger (29 November – 2 December 1942) 
 Büffel (9 – 15 December 1942) 
 Ungestüm (15 – 26 December 1942) 
 Neuland (4 – 13 March 1943) 
 Dränger (14 – 20 March 1943) 
 Seewolf (21 – 28 March 1943) 
 Siegfried (22 – 27 October 1943) 
 Siegfried 3 (27 – 30 October 1943) 
 Jahn (30 October – 2 November 1943) 
 Tirpitz 5 (2 – 8 November 1943) 
 Eisenhart 8 (9 – 10 November 1943)

Summary of raiding history

* The source's map shows the attack location to be in the Bay of Biscay. (west) However, the text mentions Cádiz, which is many miles to the south.

References

Bibliography

External links

German Type VIIC submarines
U-boats commissioned in 1941
U-boats sunk in 1944
U-boats sunk by British aircraft
U-boats sunk by depth charges
1941 ships
Ships built in Kiel
World War II submarines of Germany
Maritime incidents in June 1944